Bristol Council may be:
Bristol City Council, England
Bristol Council (Connecticut), a Boy Scouts council
Bristol Council (Pennsylvania), a Boy Scouts council